was a Japanese Shin Buddhist reformer and priest of samurai background who studied at Tokyo University in Western philosophy under the American philosopher Ernest Fenollosa. He belonged to the Ōtani-ha branch of Shin Buddhism.

Biography
Many Shin scholars feel that Kiyozawa's viewpoints are comparable to the religious existentialism of Europe.

Many Higashi Hongan-ji scholars trace their line of thought to Kiyozawa Manshi, including such men as Akegarasu Haya (1877-1954), Kaneko Daiei (1881-1976), Soga Ryōjin (1875-1971) and Maida Shuichi (1906-1967). Some of his essays were translated into English, such as the book December Fan, and have found a Western readership. Kiyozawa was instrumental to the establishment of Shinshū University in Tokyo in 1901. The university is now known as Ōtani University, and is located in Kyoto near Higashi Hongan-ji. Kiyozawa served as the first dean of the university.

In his life, however, Kiyozawa was an ambivalent figure. He was emblematic of both the need for modernization, and its pitfalls. He was not popular with the members of his temple, who considered his Dharma messages too difficult to understand. Accordingly, many of his disciples were branded heretics. Kiyozawa himself died of tuberculosis quite young and therefore some consider his thought to be immature and incomplete. Even today, many conservative Shin thinkers see Kiyozawa as being emblematic of what had gone wrong with the Ōtani school.

Intellectual influences 
Kiyozawa was attracted by three works, the Agongyō which are scriptures of early Indian Buddhism, Discourses of the Greek Philosopher Epictetus, and the Tannishō by Yuien, a disciple of Shinran. He did not get his urge to look toward the past from Honganji religious education or culture. Though, it was not unusual to look back to early Buddhism.

There were three main aspects of the Agongyō that he was attracted to: psychological insight into the Buddhist problem of spiritual ignorance, the personal relationship between the Buddha and his disciples and their commitment to drop anything for the path, and the psychological doubts expressed by the Buddha's students, which are resolved through dialogue.

The second work that Kiyozawa was inspired by was the Discourses of Epictetus. Epictetus was believed to have been a handicapped former slave, but this did not stop his academic pursuits. This perseverance was admired by Kiyozawa as Epictetus believed that pain has its origins in the unenlightened aspect of the self, and that pain can only be relieved by growth in the enlightened aspect of the self. The individual must go through this process of the self.

The third work that inspired him was the Tannishō which is the only one of the three works which came from the Shin school of Buddhism. Kiyozawa wanted to learn Shinran's thought but rejected Honganji which was built on Pure Land Patriarchs, Shinran's Kyōgyōshinshō, and Rennyo's letters. This text was somewhat exclusive as some say that it was limited to Shin clergy; Rennyo said that only those “karmically ready” should be allowed to view it. He thought the work was so relevant that he published it in the journal Seishinkai making it available to the public. His efforts were taken up by later generations which resulted in Rennyo's letters being replaced by the Tannishō as the core Japanese language text for transmitting Shin thought. Unlike the Mahāyāna sutras, these three works employ a dialogic style where specific problems are addressed, making them concrete.

Works translated to English 
Two translations has been made of Manshi's essays:

References

Further reading
 Bloom, Alfred. "Kiyozawa Manshi and the Path to the Revitalization of Buddhism." Pacific World: Journal of the Institute of Buddhist Studies (2003): 19–33.
 Blum, Mark L. Cultivating Spirituality: A Modern Shin Buddhist Anthology. Albany: SUNY Press, 2011.
 Franck, Frederick. The Buddha Eye: An Anthology of the Kyoto School. New York: Crossroad, 1991.
 Godart, Gerard Clinton."'Philosophy' or 'Religion'? The Confrontation with Foreign Categories in Late Nineteenth-Century Japan." Journal of the History of Ideas 69, no. 1 (2008): 71–91.
 Keown, Damien. A Dictionary of Buddhism. Oxford: Oxford University Press, 2004.

Japanese scholars of Buddhism
Pure Land Buddhism
1863 births
1903 deaths
Jōdo Shinshū Buddhist priests